James McGregor was a Scottish professional footballer who played as a wing half.

References

Scottish footballers
Association football wing halves
Queen's Park F.C. players
Vale of Leven F.C. players
Grimsby Town F.C. players
Glossop North End A.F.C. players
English Football League players